All owners of television equipment or any other equipment able or adaptable so to receive television are required by Italian law to have a television licence. The licence is used to part-fund the Italian public service broadcaster RAI. The licence fee was introduced for owners of radio sets in 1923, and is currently governed by a law which dates back to 1938. The annual cost of the licence fee is around €100 once VAT (IVA) is accounted for.

Unlike television licensing in the United Kingdom, there is no exception for those who only use a TV to receive non-broadcast signals such as playing DVDs or watching online videos.

However, if the TV is physically unable to receive any broadcast signals (usually through removing the tuner or having the antenna input sealed through an operation called Sigillatura), no set-top boxes are used to receive broadcasts and only using home media or IPTV, an exemption form may be filed every year to gain a one-year exemption from the tax.

From January 2016 all Italian electricity bills will carry a monthly surcharge which will be the equivalent of one tenth of the annual TV licence fee.

Cost of the licence fee over time

The following table shows the cost of the licence fee excluding the base rate and valued-added tax.

Abrogation Proposal 
On 5 January 2018, Italian former Prime Minister Matteo Renzi proposed to abolish the RAI licensing fee.

Notes 

Television in Italy
Licensing
Law of Italy